The Delorme Formation is a geologic formation in Northwest Territories. It preserves fossils dating back to the Silurian period.

See also

 List of fossiliferous stratigraphic units in Northwest Territories

References
 

Silurian Northwest Territories
Silurian northern paleotropical deposits
Devonian southern paleotropical deposits